Event Supplier and Services Association (ESSA) is a trade association in the United Kingdom which represents contractors and suppliers of goods and services to the exhibition industry.

History 

ESSA was established in 2008 to promote the commercial, technical, and service interests of British event companies and suppliers. It was incorporated in 2008 as private company limited by guarantee without share capital. Alongside its sister organisations, the Association of Event Organisers (AEO) and Association of Event Venues (AEV), it aims to integrate the industry with a "united voice" and increase its share of the market.

Affiliations

Memberships
International Federation of Exhibition and Event Services (IFES)
The Exhibit Designers and Producers Association (EDPA)
Exhibition and Event Association of Southern Africa (EXSA)

Partnerships
International Exhibition Logistics Association (IELA)
Towergate Coverex
Global Experience Specialists (GES)
Mash Media
Jungheinrich
ASP

Sister organisations
Association of Event Organisers (AEO)
Association of Event Venues (AEV)

Key objectives 
 To raise awareness within the sector of the importance of using a contractor or supplier that is a member of a recognised association
 To ensure ESSA has a seat at the table with any platform where guidance, standards or policies are written which may effect its membership, including HSE, BS and ISO
 To facilitate a vibrant, effective and professional organisation, committed to helping develop business by delivering advice and support to members and the wider event community
 To provide exclusive member discounts and offers, and networking opportunities with peers, suppliers and potential customers
 To promote, conduct, manage and co-operate with Associations, Clubs, Societies and other bodies in promoting, conducting or managing shows, exhibitions and demonstrations

References

External links
 

Trade associations based in the United Kingdom
Event management
Dacorum